Antonella Capriotti (born 4 February 1962 in Rome) is a retired Italian long jumper and triple jumper.

She has won the Italian Championships 18 times (12 outdoor and 8 indoor).

Biography

She started off her career as a long jumper and later, with excellent results, succeeded also in triple jump, that was ushering in various international competitions.
She was also the first Italian athlete to cross the threshold of fourteen meters in triple jump. Her personal best of 6.72 meters in long jump (established in 1994) still remains the third best performance ever in Italy after Fiona May's 7.11m and Valentina Uccheddu's 6.80m.

She participated in the Seoul Olympic Games in 1988 and in the Barcelona Olympic Games in 1992. She currently lives in Verona, Italy. She was invited from the RAI (the Italian state owned public service broadcaster and biggest Italian television company) to comment the World Athletics Championship 2011 in Daegu.

Statistics

World records
Masters
 Triple jump W35: 14.00 m ( Milan, 2 June 1997) - record holder until 2 August 1987.

National records
Senior
 Long jump: 6.72 m ( Florence, 24 February 1988) - holder until 15 July 1994.
 Triple jump: 14.18 m ( Terracina, 21 August 1993) - holder until 5 June 1998.

Masters
 Triple jump W35: 14.00 m ( Milan, 2 June 1997) - current holder.

Achievements
Capriotti has disputed three outdoor World Championships and two Olympics.

National titles
Capriotti won 18 national championships at individual senior level.

Italian Athletics Championships
Long jump: 1984, 1985, 1986, 1987, 1988, 1989, 1990, 1993 (8)
Triple jump: 1991, 1992, 1993, 1997 (4)
Italian Indoor Athletics Championships
Long jump: 1987, 1988, 1992, 1993, 1996 (5)
60 m: 1982 (1)

See also
 Italy national athletics team - Women's more caps
 Italian record progression women's long jump
 Italian all-time lists - Long jump
 Italian all-time lists - Triple jump
 Italy national athletics team
 Masters W35 triple jump world record progression
 List of Italian records in masters athletics

References

External links
 

1962 births
Living people
Italian female triple jumpers
Italian female long jumpers
Italian masters athletes
Athletes (track and field) at the 1988 Summer Olympics
Athletes (track and field) at the 1992 Summer Olympics
Olympic athletes of Italy
Athletes from Rome
World Athletics Championships athletes for Italy
Mediterranean Games gold medalists for Italy
Mediterranean Games bronze medalists for Italy
Athletes (track and field) at the 1983 Mediterranean Games
Athletes (track and field) at the 1987 Mediterranean Games
Athletes (track and field) at the 1997 Mediterranean Games
Universiade medalists in athletics (track and field)
Mediterranean Games medalists in athletics
Universiade bronze medalists for Italy
Medalists at the 1981 Summer Universiade
Italian female sprinters
Italian Athletics Championships winners